Marco Zanchi (born 15 April 1977) is a retired Italian footballer who played as a defender.

Career
Born in San Giovanni Bianco, Zanchi made his professional debut with Atalanta in 1994. He appeared in 19 games before 1996, when he transferred to Bari. He played very little in Bari, playing only 6 games before he was acquired by Udinese. Over 3 seasons there, Marco played in 42 matches. In 2000, he was on the Italian U-21 squad for the UEFA U-21 Championships. Zanchi was also on the Italian Squad for the Football at the 2000 Summer Olympics. He was acquired by Juventus in 2000. As part of the deal, Udinese got Morgan De Sanctis outright.

On 16 July 2012, he retired and began to work as an assistant coach with Vicenza, alongside Roberto Breda, and later Alessandro Dal Canto. On 15 July 2013, he became the assistant coach for Unione Venezia alongside Dal Canto once again. On 15 July 2014, he was appointed the new head coach of the "Allievi Nazionali" Vicenza Youth squad.

Honours

International
Italy Under-21
UEFA European Under-21 Championship: 2000

References

External links

gazzetta.it
aic.football.it
FIGC

1977 births
Living people
Sportspeople from the Province of Bergamo
Association football defenders
Italian footballers
Italy youth international footballers
Italy under-21 international footballers
Footballers at the 2000 Summer Olympics
Olympic footballers of Italy
Atalanta B.C. players
S.S.C. Bari players
A.C. ChievoVerona players
Udinese Calcio players
Juventus F.C. players
L.R. Vicenza players
Hellas Verona F.C. players
Bologna F.C. 1909 players
A.C.R. Messina players
Serie A players
Serie B players
Footballers from Lombardy